Euchromia madagascariensis is a moth of the subfamily Arctiinae. It was described by Jean Baptiste Boisduval in 1833. It is found in Madagascar and South Africa.

References

 

Moths described in 1833
Euchromiina